Stone Bridge Press, Inc. is a publishing company distributed by Consortium Book Sales & Distribution and founded in 1989. Authors published include Donald Richie and Frederik L. Schodt. Stone Bridge publishes books related to Japan, having published some 90 books on a wide variety of subjects: anime and manga, calligraphy, and origami; guides on Japanese customs, culture, and aesthetics; Japanese language books, Japan-related fiction, poetry, and nonfiction. Recently, Stone Bridge has broadened its subjects to more of Asia, and have published books on Korea and China, as well.

History
Stone Bridge Press was founded in 1989 by Peter Goodman. Seventeen years later in 2005, Goodman sold the press to Japanese book distributor Yohan Inc. Shortly before Yohan Inc. announced their bankruptcy in July 2008, Stone Bridge was bought by IBC (Intercultural Book Company) Publishing of Tokyo, a former Yohan subsidiary. In Fall 2009, Goodman reacquired Stone Bridge from IBC. They are now an independent press.

Published authors
 Jonathan Clements
 Liza Dalby
 Naoki Inose
 Helen McCarthy
 Donald Richie
 Hiroaki Sato
 Frederick L. Schodt

Notable publications
 The Astro Boy Essays
 The Donald Richie Reader
 Dreamland Japan: Writings on Modern Manga
 The Four Immigrants Manga
 Persona: A Biography of Yukio Mishima

Notes

External links 
 

Book publishing companies based in Berkeley, California
Publishing companies established in 1989
1989 establishments in California
Japan in non-Japanese culture